The Confession is a 1920 American silent drama film directed by Bertram Bracken, based on the play of the same name by Hal Reid. The film stars Henry B. Walthall as Father Bartlett, a priest who refuses to reveal the identity of a killer after hearing his confession, even though Bartlett's brother Tom is on trial for the crime.

The film was re-released in 1927 under the title Confession.

Cast
 Henry B. Walthall as Father Bartlett
 Francis McDonald as Tom Bartlett
 William Clifford as Joseph Dumont
 Margaret McWade as Mrs. Bartlett
 Margaret Landis as Rose Creighton
 Barney Furey as Jimmie Creighton

Reception
Upon release, a reviewer for Kansas City, Missouri's The Independent wrote a positive review of the film, praising Walthall's performance and calling the film "the strongest dramatic picture that has come out of motion picture studios."

References

External links
 

1920 drama films
American silent feature films
Silent American drama films
Films directed by Bertram Bracken